The DAS Building bombing was a truck bomb attack in Bogotá, Colombia, at 7:30 am on 6 December 1989, targeting the Administrative Department of Security (DAS) headquarters. 

A truck parked near the building exploded, killing 57  people instantly and injuring 2,248. The bomb blast, an estimated 500 kg of dynamite,  destroyed 14 city blocks and destroyed more than 300 commercial properties. The last victim of the bombing died on April 27 1990. It was the deadliest car bomb attack in Latin America before being succeeded by the AMIA bombing 5 years later. 
It is widely believed that the Medellín Cartel was responsible for the attack, in an attempt to assassinate DAS director Miguel Maza Márquez, who escaped unharmed. The same group was believed to be behind the bombing of Avianca Flight 203 9 days before.

The DAS building bombing was the last in the long series of attacks that targeted Colombian politicians, officials, and journalists in 1989, which started with the January 18 killing of 12 judicial officials in Simacota.

References

1989 murders in Colombia
20th century in Bogotá
20th-century mass murder in South America
Attacks on buildings and structures in 1989
Attacks on buildings and structures in Colombia
Car and truck bombings in Colombia
December 1989 crimes
December 1989 events in South America
Failed assassination attempts in South America
Improvised explosive device bombings in 1989
Improvised explosive device bombings in Colombia
Mass murder in 1989
Mass murder in Bogotá
Medellín Cartel
Organized crime events in Colombia
Terrorist incidents in Bogotá
Terrorist incidents in Colombia in the 1980s
 
Building bombings in South America
Events in Bogotá